The Wife of an Important Man (translit. zawgat ragol mohim) is a 1988 Egyptian drama film directed by Mohamed Khan. Starring Ahmad Zaki and Mervat Amin, the film tells us the story of the rise and fall of a police officer during the regime of Anwar El Sadat. It is one of the Top 100 Egyptian films.

Synopsis
When Mona marries the seemingly decent police officer Hisham, she finds out there is more into him than what he shows to the people.

Cast
 Ahmad Zaki as Hesham
 Mervat Amin as Mona
 Abdel Halim Hafez as Himself (archive footage)
 Hassan Hosny
 Zizi Mustafa
 Nahed Samir

Reception
It received the Silver Award at the Damascus Film Festival in 1987, and was screened in competition at the 15th Moscow International Film Festival in 1987. Was also screened at the Montreal, Valencia, Tetouan, Digne, Istanbul and Nantes Film Festivals in 1987 and 1988.

References

External links

1988 films
1988 drama films
1980s Arabic-language films
Films directed by Mohamed Khan
Egyptian drama films